Middle Peak is a high and prominent mountain summit in the San Miguel Mountains range of the Rocky Mountains of North America.

Topographic prominence
Neighboring Dolores Peak on the same drainage divide may be higher than Middle Peak.  If this is the case, Dolores Peak would be the more topographically prominent of the two summits.

Historical names
Dolores Peak
Middle Peak

See also

List of mountain peaks of North America
List of mountain peaks of the United States
List of mountain peaks of Colorado

References

External links

Mountains of Colorado
Mountains of Dolores County, Colorado
Mountains of San Miguel County, Colorado
San Juan National Forest
Uncompahgre National Forest
North American 4000 m summits